The Kingdom Filipina Hacienda–Autocratic Sovereign Monarchy, or simply the Kingdom Filipina Hacienda (KFH), is an organization in the Philippines based in Iligan. Associated with the sovereign citizen movement, the group does not recognize the government of the Republic of the Philippines as legitimate.

Background
The Kingdom Filipina Hacienda is a group which claims to be an autocratic sovereign monarchy. It has been extant since March 2008.

It is led by Salvacion Legaspi a woman who style herself as "Queen Majesty" and "Queen of the Motherland".

It is headquartered in a building they call as the "Royal Castle" in Barangay Pala-o in Iligan. They have their own Tribunal Rural Bank and issue their own currency which they call the "euro". They do not recognize the government of the Republic of the Philippines as legitimate. The KFH claims ownership over the Philippines, calling itself as the "New Philippines".

The KFH has been linked to the sovereign citizen movement, claiming legitimacy by "divine empowerment" and "common law".

Incidents

Iligan high school occupation
On December 26, 2020, Salvacion Legaspi and her followers occupied the Francisca Paradela Legazpi Memorial School in Iligan without the consent of the school administration. The city police came to intervene and arrested 24 KFH members including Legaspi.

KFH ambassador in Singapore
In May 2021, British national Benjamin Glynn was arrested for not wearing a mask in Singapore, in defiance of COVID-19 pandemic protocols, as well as harassing the police and for being a public nuisance. He insist that laws does not apply to him claiming to being a "sovereign citizen". Abdul Rashid Abdul Rahman, a Singaporean, attempted to represent Glynn in defense of a "sovereign compatriot" despite having no license to pratice law. Abdul Rashid affiliates himself with the KFH claiming to be the self-styled monarchy's "ambassador-at-large and advocate". Glynn would be deported in August 2021.

Lee Hui Yin disrupted the Glynn trial calling the procedure a "kangaroo court" and was accused of disrespected the judge. She had additional charges after she allegedly for getting into a spat with two police officers over mask mandates. Lee, also a sovereign citizen herself, likewise wanted Abdul Rashid to represent her in her case.

Abdul Rashid himself would also be charged for failing to wear a mask in two separate occasions in 2022 and invoked his status as a sovereign citizen in a bid to prove the court has no authority over him.

References

Sovereign citizen movement
Organizations based in the Philippines
Iligan
Pseudolaw
2008 establishments in the Philippines